Sagarahan-Ganjōji Station (相良藩願成寺駅, Sagarahan ganjōji eki) is a railway station in Hitoyoshi, Kumamoto Prefecture, Japan. It is on the Kumagawa Railroad Yunomae Line. The station opened on 1 April 1937.

History
 1 April 1937 - The station opened under the control of the Japanese Government Railway (JGR) as Higashi Hitoyoshi station.
 1 June 1949 - JGR became the Japanese National Railways (JNR)
 20 January 1959 - Freight services stopped on the line
 1 April 1987 - JNR becomes privatized, and the station comes under the control of the newly created Kyushu Railway Company (JR Kyushu)
 10 October 1989 - The Yunomae Line was transferred to the newly incorporated third-sector railroad, Kumagawa Railway. The station was also renamed to its current name.
 23 April 1992 - The station was renovated.

Lines/Layout
The station is served by the Kumagawa Railroad Yunomae Line. The station has 1 track serving both directions with 1 side platform. The station was renovated in 1997.

Passenger stats

Adjacent Stations

See also
 List of railway stations in Japan

References

Railway stations in Kumamoto Prefecture
Railway stations in Japan opened in 1937